Lindsey Webster is an American jazz, R&B, and pop singer. Her first single, "Fool Me Once", reached number one on the Smooth Jazz chart at Billboard magazine (2016),  making her the first vocalist since Sade's 2010 "Soldier of Love" to have a #1 vocally-driven song in the primarily instrumental format. Since then Webster has scored six Top 5 hits, including "Where Do You Want To Go" (#1), Back To Your Heart (#2), Open Up (#3), Next To Me (#3), & Love Inside.

Webster was born in Woodstock, New York, and as a child played the cello. She became interested in singing and studied at the Fiorello H. LaGuardia High School of Music & Art and Performing Arts. She released her first album independently in 2013.

Discography
 Lindsey Webster (2013)
 You Change (Atlanta, 2015)
 Back to Your Heart (Shanachie, 2016)
 Love Inside (Shanachie, 2018)
 A Woman Like Me (Shanachie, 2020)
 Reasons (Shanachie, 2022)

References

American women jazz singers
American jazz singers
American singer-songwriters
Living people
Smooth jazz singers
Ballad musicians
Year of birth missing (living people)
21st-century American women